The Parliament of South Ossetia is the unicameral legislature of the partially recognized Republic of South Ossetia. The 34 members of parliament are elected using a mixed system of Party-list proportional representation (17) and single-member districts (17). South Ossetia has a multi-party system, and currently 5 political parties are represented in parliament and has 6 independent MPs elected through single-member districts. The parliament is headed by a speaker, who is elected from among the members. Since 15 september 2022 the speaker of parliament is Alan Alborov, one of the four deputees of the Nykhaz party of president Alan Gagloev, after Alan Tadtaev of United Ossetia was forced to resign.

The parliament of South Ossetia meets in the capital Tskhinvali. The parliament building, built in 1937, was heavily damaged in the 2008 South Ossetia war.

Latest election

List of speakers

Until 27 November 1996, the speaker (or "chairman") of the parliament was also Head of State.
Torez Kulumbegov (10 October 1990 – 4 May 1991)
Znaur Gassiyev (4 May 1991 – 9 September 1992)
Torez Kulumbegov (9 September 1992 – 17 September 1993)
Lyudvig Chibirov (17 September 1993 – 27 November 1996)
Kosta Georgievich Dzugaev (1996 – 1999)
Stanislav Kochiev (1999 – 2004)
Znaur Gassiyev (2nd time) (2004 – 9 June 2009)
Stanislav Kochiev (2nd time) (9 June 2009 – 5 October 2011)
Zurab Kokoyev (5 October 2011 – 2 July 2012; acting)
Stanislav Kochiev (3rd time) (2 July 2012 – 23 June 2014)
Anatoly Bibilov (23 June 2014 – 21 April 2017)
Inal Mamiev (21 April – 7 June 2017)
Pyotr Gassiev (7 June 2017 – 20 June 2019)
Alan Tadtaev (20 June 2019 - 15 September 2022)
Alan Alborov (15 September 2022 - present)

References

Politics of South Ossetia
Political organisations based in South Ossetia
South Ossetia